Pergalė (meaning Victory in English) was a literary magazine in Soviet Lithuania issued between 1942 and 1990.

Profile
Pergalė was started in 1942 as a literary supplement to the army newspaper Motherland is Calling ("Tėvynė šaukia") of the 16th "Lithuanian" Rifle Division (Soviet Union), hence the name. The magazine had its headquarters in Vilnius. It included articles about nature in addition to those on literary work.

Editors in chief
 Juozas Pajaujis – 1942
 Kostas Korsakas – 1943–1944
 Petras Cvirka – 1945
 Juozas Baltušis – 1946–1954
 Jonas Šimkus – 1954–1958
 Vladas Mozūriūnas – 1958–1964
 Algimantas Baltakis – 1964–1976, 1985–1990
 Juozas Macevičius – 1976–1985
 Juozas Aputis – 1990

See also
 List of magazines in Lithuania

References

External links
 Worldcat

Defunct literary magazines published in Europe
Defunct magazines published in Lithuania
Eastern Bloc mass media
Magazines published in Lithuania
Magazines established in 1942
Magazines disestablished in 1990
Mass media in Vilnius
Magazines published in the Soviet Union
Lithuanian-language magazines
Newspaper supplements